Homosassa Springs is an unincorporated community and census-designated place (CDP) in Citrus County, Florida, United States. The population was 13,791 at the 2010 census. Homosassa Springs is the principal city of the Homosassa Springs, Florida, Metropolitan Statistical Area.

The name derives from the warm spring located in Homosassa Springs Wildlife State Park that attracts manatees to the area.

Geography and climate

Homosassa Springs is located in southern Citrus County at  (28.807216, -82.550012). The CDP is to the east of U.S. Routes 19 and 98 (Suncoast Boulevard); the CDP of Homosassa is located to the west of the highway, as is Homosassa Springs Wildlife State Park. Homosassa Springs is bordered to the northwest by the city of Crystal River, to the east by Lecanto, and to the south by Sugarmill Woods.

Demographics

As of the 2020 census, Homosassa Springs had a population of 14,283 with 5,946 households. 

Of that population 5.7% was under 5 years old, 17.6% was under 18 years old, roughly 50.4% was between 18 and 65, and 26.3% was 65 years and older. 

51.1% of the population was female persons, 2.8% were foreign born persons, and there were 1,594 veterans living in Homosassa Springs. 

95.1% of the population was white, 1.2% was black, 0.4% was American Indian and Alaska Native, 0.1% was Asian, 3.3% was two or more races, 3.5% was Hispanic or Latino. 

The median value of owner-occupied housing units was $86,500 and the median gross rent was $750. 

86.6% of the population 25 years and older had a high school diploma or higher, and 7.7% of the population 25 years and older had a Bachelor’s degree or higher. 

90.2% of the households had a computer and 81.2% of the households had a broadband internet subscription.

Education
Homosassa Springs is served by Citrus County School District. Residents are divided between Homosassa Elementary, Lecanto Elementary, and Rock Crusher Elementary; Crystal River Middle School and Lecanto Middle School; and Crystal River High School and Lecanto High School.

The Homosassa Public Library of Citrus Libraries is located in Homosassa Springs.

Notable person
 Dazzy Vance, baseball pitcher, Hall of Fame inductee

References

External links

 Citrus County Visitors & Convention Bureau

Census-designated places in Citrus County, Florida
Micropolitan areas of Florida
Unincorporated communities in Citrus County, Florida